The Fleming Building is an historic building located in downtown Des Moines, Iowa, United States. It was listed on the National Register of Historic Places in 2002.

Architecture
The Chicago architectural firm of D.H. Burnham and Company designed the building in the early Commercial style and it was completed in 1909. It is one of the earliest steel-framed buildings in Iowa. Elements of the Beaux-Arts style are found in the building's proportions and details, which is typical of the Burnham Company's work.

References

Office buildings completed in 1907
National Register of Historic Places in Des Moines, Iowa
Office buildings on the National Register of Historic Places in Iowa
Commercial architecture in Iowa
Office buildings in Des Moines, Iowa
Chicago school architecture in Iowa